Pembridge Castle, originally called Newland Castle, is a late 12th century to early 13th century Grade I listed former border castle located approximately  northwest of Welsh Newton in Herefordshire, England.

It was most likely constructed by Matilda de St Valery sometime before 1208. Founded by 1208, it was the seat of the Pembridge family, then later the Wakes and Mortimer families in the 14th and 15th centuries. The chapel is 16th century and was ruined in 1644 during the English Civil War. Much reconstruction of the castle was undertaken in the early 20th century by a Dr Hedley Bartlett. It remains in private ownership.

The castle sits on a 36 m x 27 m plot of land and is surrounded by a moat.  It is constructed of ashlar, sandstone and rubble walls.  The curtain wall surrounding the castle is 1.4 m thick.  The earliest part of the castle, thought to be the keep, is the four story round tower on the western corner.  The internal diameter of the tower is 7.5 m and the internal rooms of the tower are 5 m wide.

See also
Castles in Great Britain and Ireland
List of castles in England

References

External links
History from castlewales.com
History from 'The Gatehouse'

Grade I listed buildings in Herefordshire
Castles in Herefordshire